Gonopacha is a genus of moths in the family Lasiocampidae. The genus was erected by Per Olof Christopher Aurivillius in 1927.

Species
Gonopacha brotoessa Holland, 1893
Gonopacha rothschildi Aurivillius, 1927

References

Lasiocampidae